The 14th Jutra Awards were held on March 11, 2012 to honour films made with the participation of the Quebec film industry in 2011.

Winners and nominees

References

2012 in Quebec
Jutra
14
Jutra